The Tan Shan River (also known as River Jhelum, ; Hong Kong Hakka: Dan1san1 Ho2) is a river in the northeastern New Territories of Hong Kong. The river originates in Ping Fung Shan near Pat Sin Leng. It flows through the Hok Tau Reservoir and Ping Che before finally emptying into the Ng Tung River near Kwan Tei.

See also
List of rivers and nullahs in Hong Kong

References
2007. 2007 Hong Kong Map. Easy Finder Ltd.

External links

Rivers of Hong Kong, in Chinese

Rivers of Hong Kong
Hok Tau